The Onion River is a  stream in northeastern Minnesota, the United States, flowing directly into Lake Superior.

A small property at the mouth of the river is managed by the Minnesota Department of Natural Resources as Ray Berglund State Wayside, a memorial donated by the friends of a St. Paul businessman and conservationist in 1951.

See also
Paul Bunyan
List of rivers of Minnesota

References

External links
Minnesota Watersheds
USGS Hydrologic Unit Map - State of Minnesota (1974)

Rivers of Minnesota
Tributaries of Lake Superior